Pheasant Island is an uninhabited river island in the Bidasoa river, located between France and Spain, whose administration alternates between the two nations.

Etymology
There are no pheasants on the island. 
It is proposed that the name could be a misinterpretation of some French word related to "passing" or "toll".
The "Conference" name could come from the international meetings held there.

History 

The most important historical event to have taken place on the island was the signing of the Treaty of the Pyrenees. This was the climax to a series of 24 conferences held between Luis Méndez de Haro, a grandee of Spain, and Cardinal Mazarin, Chief Minister of France, in 1659 following the end of the Thirty Years' War. A monolith was built in the centre of the island to commemorate the meeting.

The island has also been used for several other royal meetings:
1659 – Louis XIV met his future wife Maria Theresa of Spain (1638–1683); they were the parents of Louis, Grand Dauphin; a year later – at the Meeting on the Isle of Pheasants – she said farewell to her father, Philip IV of Spain and much of the Spanish court, before crossing into France to become the consort of Louis XIV.
1721 – Louis XV met his intended bride Mariana Victoria of Spain (1718–1781). The two never married; Louis instead married Marie Leszczyńska, and Mariana, the future Joseph I of Portugal.

Political status 
The island is a condominium, the world's smallest, under joint sovereignty of Spain and France, and for alternating periods of six months is officially under the governance of the naval commanders of San Sebastián, Spain (1 February – 31 July) and of Bayonne, France (1 August – 31 January).
Currently, the French position of "adjunct département director, delegate for the sea and coast of the Atlantic Pyrenees and Landes" carries the title of "viceroy of Pheasant Island", an unusual name in the French Republic.
One of the French officers with this title was Julien Viaud, better known as the writer Pierre Loti.
In practice, it is administered in turn by the mayors of Irun (in Gipuzkoa, Spain) and Hendaye (in the Pyrénées-Atlantiques, France).

Geography 

Since the Franco-Spanish boundary line follows the thalweg of the Bidasoa river's main course, which is located on the northern shore of the islet, the whole territory of Pheasant Island is an enclave located within the borders of Spain.

Access 
The island can sometimes be reached on foot from the Spanish side at low tide. It is uninhabited, and access is forbidden, except very occasionally on heritage open days. Other than that, employees of the municipal government of Irun or Hendaye may access the island once every six months for cleaning and gardening, and members of the Naval Commands of San Sebastián (Spain) and Bayonne (France), responsible for monitoring the island, land on it every five days.

See also 

 List of islands of France
 List of islands of Spain

References

External links

Pheasant Island article from BBC News
The World's Only Border-Swapping Island by The Tim Traveller on YouTube
Faisanes, Isla de los (in Spanish) at Auñamendi Encyclopedia

River islands of Spain
River islands of France
Islands of Nouvelle-Aquitaine
France–Spain border
Landforms of Pyrénées-Atlantiques
Irun
International islands
Condominia (international law)
Diplomatic sites
Landforms of the Basque Country (autonomous community)